National Lithuanian Electricity Association was established on 6 June 2011. 

NLEA represents Lithuania in Eurelectric.

Members 
 LESTO
 Lietuvos energija
 Litgrid
 Technologijų ir inovacijų centras

See also 
 Lithuanian Electricity Association

References

External links 
 

Trade associations based in Lithuania
Electric power companies of Lithuania
2011 establishments in Lithuania